Corey Terry (born March 6, 1976) is an American former professional football linebacker who played in the National Football League (NFL) for the Jacksonville Jaguars and New Orleans Saints from 1999 to 2000.

References

1976 births
Living people
People from Warrenton, North Carolina
Players of American football from North Carolina
American football linebackers
Tennessee Volunteers football players
Jacksonville Jaguars players
New Orleans Saints players